Today We're the Greatest is the second studio album by Australian alternative-indie rock band Middle Kids, released on 19 March 2021. The album peaked at number 5 on the ARIA Charts.

At the 2021 ARIA Music Awards, the album won Best Rock Album.

At the J Awards of 2021, the album was nominated for Australian Album of the Year.

Release
Today We're the Greatest was released on 19 March 2021 on CD, digital download, and streaming services.

A pink and orange splattered LP was released exclusively in Australian JB Hi-Fi stores.

Track listing

Personnel
Middle Kids
 Hannah Joy – writing, vocals, guitar, piano 
 Tim Fitz – bass, production 
 Harry Day	– drums

Charts

References

2021 albums
ARIA Award-winning albums
Middle Kids albums